Major General Mohammed Jega was military Governor of Gongola State, Nigeria between March 1976 and July 1978 during the military regime of General Olusegun Obasanjo, and again between January 1984 and August 1985 during the military regime of General Muhammadu Buhari.

Jega held the posts of Commander of the 6th Brigade of the 2nd Division, Onitsha, and General Officer Commanding 2nd Mechanised Division of the Nigerian Army, Ibadan.
In his second term as governor, he closed most of the schools that had been created by the civilian administration of governor Abubakar Barde due to budgetary constraints.

After retirement, Jega took an active part in the chieftainship lobbies in the 1980s.
On 5 June 2005, Jega was named Emir of Gwandu in Kebbi State, replacing Alhaji Mustapha Jokolo.

References

Living people
Year of birth missing (living people)
Governors of Gongola State
Nigerian generals
Nigerian Muslims